A Yake is a 2018 Burmese drama television series. It is based on the eponymous popular novel written by Ma Sandar. It aired on MRTV-4, from May 2 to June 12, 2018, on Mondays to Fridays at 19:00 for 31 episodes.

Cast

Main
 Yan Aung as U Thar Hlaing, father of Su Su Hlaing
 Soe Myat Thuzar as Telmar, mother of Su Su Hlaing
 May Myint Mo as Su Su Hlaing
 Nat Khat as Kyaw Htun Nyo, elder brother of A Mar Nyo
 Hein Htet as Nyi Lin Nyo, younger brother of A Mar Nyo
Khay Sett Thwin as A Mar Nyo
Nan Sandar Hla Htun as Thet Thet
 Kyaw Kyaw as Pauk Kyaing

Supporting
 Mike Mike as Freddy
 Cho Pyone as Mommy Gyi, grandmother of Su Su Hlaing
 May Mi Ko Ko as Nelly Cho
 Zu Zu Zan as Khin Oo
 So Pyay Myint as Sai Min Aung
 Hein Min Thu as Sai Min Swe
 Goon Pone Gyi as Daw Aye Tin
 Phyo Eaindra Min as Nan Moe Aye
 Daw Nwet Nwet San as May May Gyi, grandmother of A Mar Nyo
 Than Than Soe as mother of A Mar Nyo
 Khin Moht Moht Aye as mother of Thet Thet

References

Burmese television series
MRTV (TV network) original programming